Cadmium was the sixth album by the progressive-classical rock band Sky, released in December 1983. The album contents were a mixture of Sky traditions and new elements – it contained a classical-rock arrangement of Prokofiev's "Sleigh Ride" (from the "Lieutenant Kijé Suite"), alongside seven original compositions and the first examples of commissioned compositions from contemporary writers from outside the band (in this case, Kevin Peek's old friend and fellow Cliff Richard collaborator Alan Tarney, who provided two original tunes). The colour of the album cover is primarily cadmium yellow, a pigment used by painters.

In February 1984, John Williams parted company with Sky, returning to a full-time classical career. Williams had previously hinted that his work with Sky had been intended as a five-year stint. 
In 2015, Esoteric Recordings continued a schedule of remasters and expanded releases with this recording.

Track listing
Side 1
"Troika" (Sergei Prokofiev/Auth. Arr. Tristan Fry) – 3:00
"Fayre" (Kevin Peek) – 3:07
"A Girl in Winter" (Alan Tarney) – 3:30
"Mother Russia" (Steve Gray) – 6:53
"Telex From Peru" (Herbie Flowers) – 8:10

Side 2
"The Boy From Dundee" (Herbie Flowers) – 5:21
"Night" (Kevin Peek) – 3:54
"Then & Now" (Tristan Fry) – 3:25
"Return to Me" (Alan Tarney) – 3:50
"Son of Hotta" (Steve Gray) – 6:59

2015 two disc reissue edition

Musicians
Tristan Fry – Drums (Premier), Percussion (Sleigh Bells, Besson B Flat Trumpet with cup mute, Latin Percussion).
Kevin Peek – Guitars (Gibson L5S, Fender Stratocaster).
Steve Gray – Vocals & Keyboards (William De Blaise Harpsichord, Roland Jupiter 8, Yamaha DX-7, Synton Syrinx, Oberheim OBX A, Roland Juno 60, Yamaha CS 01 – BC1 ("Gobsynth"), Steinway, Harpsichord/OBX A – Piano/JP8 (Interface developed by Andrew Jones)). 
Herbie Flowers – Bass (Fender Jazz Bass, Old English String Bass)
John Williams – Guitars (Takamine 15E, Greg Smallman Classical).

Production
Produced by: SKY, Tony Clark and Haydn Bendall
Engineered by: Tony Clark
Recorded with Mobile 1 Recording Studio and at EMI Abbey Road Studio Three.
Mixed at: EMI Abbey Road Studio Three.
Mastered by: Chris Blair
Management: Peter Lyster-Todd
Art Direction: Nick Marchant
Design: Torchlight, London

Charts

Certifications

References

1983 albums
Arista Records albums
Ariola Records albums
Sky (English/Australian band) albums